Southern Cross Drive, Canberra is a dual carriageway road in the district of Belconnen, Australian Capital Territory. It bypasses the suburbs of  Page, Florey, Latham, Scullin, Higgins, Holt and Macgregor. Southern Cross Drive becomes Parkwood Road west of Macgregor. Parkwood Road is the main thoroughfare to Parkwood Landfill and Ginninderra Falls. The general speed limit is 60 km/h, with an 80 km/h limit between Kingsford Smith Drive and Coulter Drive

The road is named after the aircraft flown by Sir Charles Kingsford Smith. Sir Kingsford Smith also has the nearby Kingsford Smith Drive named after him.

See also

Streets in Canberra
Roads in the Australian Capital Territory